The 49th Military Police Brigade is California's only Army National Guard military police brigade and is headquartered in Fairfield, California. The 49th's primary role in California is to provide defense support to civilian authorities (DSCA) in the northern region of the state. As part of its federal mission, the 49th Military Police Brigade stands ready to deploy and respond to support missions around the world. The brigade is the part of the Homeland Response Force (HRF).

History
The 49th was officially reorganized in May 2005 and was immediately deployed forward in support of Operation Iraqi Freedom (OIF).  During its OIF tour, the 49th was tasked with the training of fledgling Iraqi Police force and maintained command and control over 3-thousand Soldiers in three military police battalions.

Operation Iraqi Freedom 05-07
The 49th MP Brigade reorganized on 16 January 2005, specifically to mobilize and deploy in support of Operation Iraqi Freedom.  The brigade mobilized at Fort Hood, TX in May 2005.  They conducted four months of post mobilization training and deployed to Iraq, through Kuwait in October 2005.  The unit formally took over the mission from the 42nd Military Police Brigade, Fort Lewis, WA, on 2 November 2005.

The mission of the brigade was to provide military police support to Multi-National Forces-Iraq, as well as support to the Iraqi Police.  As part of its support to the Iraqi police, the brigade formed Police Transition Teams which worked closely with local police in 14 of Iraq's 18 provinces.

In addition to its mission to train the Iraqi police, they also provided security for Iraq's Tier 1 government officials, including the President and Prime Minister of Iraq.  They also provided security for the US Embassy in Baghdad and personal security for the US Ambassador, Deputy US Ambassador, and the UN Ambassador and Deputy.

While theater level detention operations where the responsibility of the 43rd Military Police Brigade, the brigades 709th Military Police Battalion did assist the 101st Airborne Division in running their brigade and division internment facilities until that mission was withdrawn.

The brigade also conducted law and order missions for Victory Base Complex, COB Speicher, LSA Anaconda, and Talil Air Base.  This mission enabled commanders to provide a safe and secure environment for their soldiers to live.

The brigade was relieved of its mission in March 2007.

While deployed the brigade commanded military police units from the Regular Army stationed in CONUS, Europe, and Korea, National Guard from eight states and the District of Columbia, one US Army Reserve region, and the United States Air Force.  They consisted of three MP battalions, 23 companies, and five detachments.

Organization
It is composed of the following units:
49th MP Brigade, Headquarters & Headquarters Company – Fairfield
143rd Military Police Battalion – Lancaster
Headquarters & Headquarters Company – Lancaster
40th MP Company – Los Alamitos
140th Chemical Company – Gardena
330th MP Company – Ontario
670th MP Company – National City
 185th Military Police Battalion – Pittsburg
Headquarters & Headquarters Company – Pittsburg
149th Chemical Company (MS) – Lathrop
270th MP Company – Sacramento
Detachment 1, 270th MP Company – Madera
870th MP Company – Concord
Detachment 1, 870th MP Company – San Luis Obispo
 579th Engineer Battalion – Santa Rosa
Headquarters & Headquarters Company – Santa Rosa
Forward Support Company – Santa Rosa
129th Engineer Detachment (Concrete) – Lakeport
132nd Engineer Company (Multi-Role Bridge) – Redding
Detachment 1, 132nd Engineer Company (Multi-Role Bridge) – Mount Shasta
Detachment 2, 132nd Engineer Company (Multi-Role Bridge) – Eureka
235th Engineer Company (Sapper) – Petaluma
645th Engineer Detachment – Sacramento
649th Engineer Company (Horizontal-Roads/Grading) – Chico
Detachment 1, 649th Engineer Company (Horizontal-Roads/Grading) – Red Bluff
Detachment 2, 649th Engineer Company (Horizontal-Roads/Grading) – Sacramento
1401st Engineer Detachment (Quarry) – Camp Roberts
217th Ordnance Company (EOD) – Camp Roberts

External links
 49th Military Police Brigade homepage

References

 https://web.archive.org/web/20120714075659/http://www.tioh.hqda.pentagon.mil/UniformedServices/Mottos.aspx?

049|Military Police 49
MP 049
49